Unnatural or The Unnaturals or variant, may refer to:

Film
Alraune (1952 film), also known as Unnatural, a West German science fiction horror film
The Unnaturals, a 1969 Italian-West German gothic horror film directed and written by Antonio Margheriti.

Television
 The Unnaturals (TV show), a sketch comedy program that aired between 1989 and 1991 on HA! and later CTV, the channels that later became Comedy Central
 "The Unnaturals" (Ben 10 episode), an episode of a TV series Ben 10
"The Unnatural" (Bob's Burgers), a 2013 episode of the American sitcom Bob's Burgers
"The Unnatural" (Frasier), a 1997 episode of the American sitcom Frasier
"The Unnatural" (The X-Files), a 1999 episode of the American drama The X-Files
 "The Unnatural", a 1990 episode of American sitcom Married... with Children
 Unnatural (TV series), a 2018 Japanese drama television series

See also

 
 
 
 Natural (disambiguation)
 Unnatural Acts (disambiguation)